Burning Stone is the third album by Ruins, released in 1992 through Shimmy Disc.

Track listing

Personnel 
Ruins
Ryuichi Masuda – bass guitar
Tatsuya Yoshida – vocals, drums, percussion, photography, art direction
Production and additional personnel
Michael Dorf – assistant producer
Naomi Kawakami – photography

References

External links 
 

1992 albums
Ruins (Japanese band) albums
Shimmy Disc albums